Biron is a commune in the Charente-Maritime department in southwestern France. In the late nineteenth century Philippe Delamain, a merchant from Jarnac, excavated a cemetery from the Merovingian period in Biron, part of which is now in the British Museum in London.

Population

See also
 Communes of the Charente-Maritime department

References

External links
 

Communes of Charente-Maritime